Since 1958, the "War Resisters League", the pacifist group founded in  1923, has awarded almost annually its War Resisters League Peace Award to a person or organization whose work represents the League's radical nonviolent program of Gandhian action.

Laureates

External links
https://web.archive.org/web/20070610210132/https://secure.serve.com/resist/wrl_peaceawards.htm 

Peace awards